Jiří Matoušek is the name of:

Jiří Matoušek (mathematician) (1963–2015), professor at Charles University, Prague
Jiří Matoušek (basketball), member of the Czech basketball team at the 1952 Olympics
Jiří Matoušek, chairman of the Organisation for the Prohibition of Chemical Weapons Scientific Advisory Board and professor of environmental chemistry and toxicology at Masaryk University, Brno
Jiří Matoušek, hockey player for HC Litvínov in the 1993–1994 season

See also 
Matoušek